Jeremy Finlayson (born 9 February 1996) is a professional Australian rules footballer who plays for the Port Adelaide Football Club in the Australian Football League (AFL), having been initially drafted to .

Personal life
Finlayson was born in Culcairn, New South Wales, into a family of Indigenous Australian (Yorta Yorta) descent. He grew up playing an array of sports including cricket, lawn bowls and tennis but mostly focused on Australian rules football. Finlayson attended Billabong High School in Culcairn and played his junior football with the Culcairn Lions in the Hume Football League, making his senior debut for the club in 2012 at the age of 16. 

In late 2012 he moved to Sydney to join the GWS Giants' academy program full time in order to increase his chances of being drafted into the AFL. The decision paid off at the 2014 AFL draft when the Giants drafted Finlayson with their 85th pick in the national draft. He completed his high school education at Patrician Brothers' College, Blacktown.

AFL career
Finlayson made his debut against  at Spotless Stadium in round fifteen of the 2017 season.

References

External links

1996 births
Living people
People from Culcairn
Greater Western Sydney Giants players
East Coast Eagles players
Port Adelaide Football Club players
Australian rules footballers from New South Wales
Indigenous Australian players of Australian rules football